StageCraft is an on-set virtual production visual effects technology composed of a video wall designed by Industrial Light & Magic (ILM). Initially developed for the Disney+ series The Mandalorian, it has since been used in other productions and has been cited as a revolutionary visual effects technology. The soundstage in which StageCraft is implemented is called The Volume.

History 
While shooting the film Rogue One (2016), cinematographer Greig Fraser encountered multiple issues which inspired the idea to use large LED screens as a component of the set. This idea was further developed by a team including Industrial Light & Magic's (ILM) Richard Bluff and Rob Bredow, as well as Kim Libreri of Epic Games. During the development of The Lion King (2019), director Jon Favreau worked with ILM to develop technologies in order to better visualize shots within a 3D CGI space. When Favreau began work on the Disney+ series The Mandalorian, ILM found a perfect opportunity to use the technology with a director prepared to use it.

The StageCraft process involves shooting live-action actors and sets surrounded by large, very high definition LED video walls. These walls display computer-generated backdrops, once traditionally composited primarily in post-production after shooting with green screens. These facilities are known as "volumes". When shooting, the production team is able to realign the background instantly based on moving camera positions. The entire CG background can be manipulated in real-time.

ILM used Epic Games's Unreal Engine, a popular game engine, to handle real-time 3D rendering of computer generated environments. Other technology partners in StageCraft include FuseFX, Lux Machina, Profile Studios, Nvidia, and ARRI.

ILM iterated the technology to "StageCraft 2.0" for the second season of The Mandalorian. This version featured a larger volume as well as more specialized software. One example of this software is Helios, a rendering engine designed by ILM specifically for StageCraft hardware.

In September 2020, it was announced that a second permanent volume was being created at Manhattan Beach Studios in Los Angeles, in addition to the first built for The Mandalorian, which was expected to be completed in March 2021; one at Pinewood Studios in London, to open in February 2021; and a larger, custom one at Fox Studios Australia. These new volumes would be larger, use more LED panels, and offer higher resolution than the original Manhattan Beach one. ILM also has the ability to provide "pop up" virtual production configurations in other locations. A volume is also open in Vancouver.

Productions using StageCraft

Television series 
 The Mandalorian (2019–present)
 The Book of Boba Fett (2021)
 How I Met Your Father (2022–present)
 Our Flag Means Death (2022–present)
 Obi-Wan Kenobi (2022)
 Andor (2022)
 House of the Dragon (2022)
 1899 (2022)
 Ahsoka (2023)
 Percy Jackson and the Olympians (2024)
 The Acolyte (TBA)

Feature films 
 Rogue One (2016)
 The Jungle Book (2016)
 Solo: A Star Wars Story (2018)
 The Lion King (2019)
 Star Wars: The Rise of Skywalker (2019)
 The Midnight Sky (2020)
In vacanza su Marte (2020)
 The Batman (2022)
 Thor: Love and Thunder (2022)
 Black Adam (2022)
 The Fabelmans (2022)
 Ant-Man and the Wasp: Quantumania (2023)

See also 
 Prysm Stage, a virtual production volume at Trilith Studios built in collaboration with NEP Virtual Studios

References

External links 
 

3D graphics software
Lucasfilm
On-set virtual production
Rendering systems